Rock Champions is a compilation album by Canadian rock band April Wine, released in 2000.

Track listing
All tracks written by Myles Goodwyn unless otherwise noted.
 "I Like to Rock"
 "Just Between You and Me"
 "Babes in Arms"
 "Tonite"
 "All Over Town"
 "Say Hello"
 "Too Hot to Handle"
 "Crash and Burn"
 "Caught in the Crossfire"
 "Better Do it Well" (M. Goodwyn, G. Moffet)
 "Big City Girls"
 "Bad Boys"
 "21st Century Schizoid Man" (R. Fripp, M. Giles, G. Lake, I. McDonald, P. Sinfield)
 "Wanna Rock"

Personnel
 Myles Goodwyn – vocals, guitars, keyboards
 Brian Greenway – vocals, guitars
 Gary Moffet – guitars, background vocals
 Steve Lang – bass, background vocals
 Jerry Mercer – drums, background vocals

April Wine albums
2000 greatest hits albums
Albums produced by Myles Goodwyn
Albums produced by Mike Stone (record producer)
MCA Records compilation albums
Albums produced by Nick Blagona